Carirriñe Pass is an international mountain pass in the Andes between Chile and Argentina. The pass connects Coñaripe and Liquiñe in Chile with Junín de los Andes in Argentina. At the site of the pass some of the southernmost Araucaria trees grows. The road is not paved and the pass may be closed most of the year due to snowfalls, minor landslides and rehabilitation. At the highest point the pass reaches .

References

External links

Unidad de Pasos Fronterizos - Gobierno de Chile
Gendamería Nacional Argentina - Paso Carirriñe

Argentina–Chile border crossings
Landforms of Los Ríos Region
Landforms of Neuquén Province
Mountain passes of the Andes
Mountain passes of Argentina
Mountain passes of Chile
Transport in Los Ríos Region